Jack Leland Feller (born December 10, 1936) is a retired American professional baseball player. A catcher, he played five years professionally (1955–1959) and appeared in one inning of one Major League Baseball game with the 1958 Detroit Tigers.

Feller was 21 years old and in his fourth pro season when he was summoned from the Tigers' Class A Augusta affiliate in the Sally League when the rosters expanded to 40 men in September 1958. He caught the top half of the ninth inning (in relief of Red Wilson) in a 13–2 rout of the Baltimore Orioles on September 13, with one putout and no errors. Feller never recorded a Major League plate appearance. However, he did have the distinction of catching a future Baseball Hall of Fame pitcher and United States Senator, Jim Bunning, who won his 12th game of the season that day.

Feller batted .272 in 474 minor league games before leaving baseball.

His scouting report in the March 1959 issue of Baseball Digest read: "Good arm and glove. Hitting problematical."

References

External links

1936 births
Living people
Augusta Tigers players
Baseball players from Michigan
Detroit Tigers players
Durham Bulls players
Fox Cities Foxes players
Hazlehurst-Baxley Tigers players
Knoxville Smokies players
Major League Baseball catchers
People from Adrian, Michigan
Terre Haute Tigers players